Lake Forest Academy (also known as LFA) is a co-educational college preparatory school for boarding and day students  in grades 9 through 12. The school is located on the North Shore in Lake Forest, Illinois, United States, about 30 miles north of Chicago. As of the 2019–2020 school year, the school enrolled 435 students, with the students coming from 13 states and 35 countries. This school is among the most selective boarding schools in the United States. The current head of school is Christopher O. Tennyson. The school is accredited by the National Association of Independent Schools (NAIS), Independent Schools Association of the Central States (ISACS), and the Secondary School Admission Test Board (SSATB).

History 
The original inhabitants of the region of the North Shore were the Potawatomi. The town of Lake Forest emerged in the area after the violent dispossession of the Potawatomi in the 1830s, the Chicago cholera epidemic of 1854, and the arrival of the railway from Chicago in 1855. The academy (known as "LFA") was founded in 1857 as a key part of plans for Lake Forest more generally. In tune with the religious revivalism of the time period, the boys preparatory school was Presbyterian. LFA's first principal—Samuel F. Miller—had been one of the civil engineers who helped build the railway, as well as a founder of the Presbyterian Church in town. Early curriculum included Greek, Latin, Mathematics, English, Grammar, and Geography.

Life for early students was rustic. An outdoor pump provided water for drinking and washing. In the fall and summer they often simply bathed in Lake Michigan; in the winter, however, they did not bathe at all. They recalled wandering and hunting in the ravines along Lake Michigan. Another of their pastimes was "hickory nutting," in which boys would climb trees "to shake down the nuts to...friends beneath."

In the lead-up to the Civil War, the student body received military training from the eccentric Elmer Ellsworth. The New York farm boy was enamored with the fezzes and billowy pants of local Algerian soldiers who abetted French colonization of North Africa. And so Ellsworth  he began organizing units all around the United States known as Zouaves in their image (or at least his idea of it), including at nascent Lake Forest Academy. Ellsworth would go on to acquire fame for being the first officer to be killed in the conflict. Many of the boys Ellsworth trained ended up fighting in the war, too.

The Young Ladies' Seminary at Ferry Hall, later simplified to Ferry Hall School, was founded in 1869, and was considered a sister school. Lake Forest College was a third component of the original founders' design and opened its doors later although it uses the academy's founding date as its own.  It has no formal relationship with the original schools.

It was during the leadership of Principal George Cutting (1887-1890) that the colors of orange and black were selected, perhaps influenced by the fact that Cutting had attended Princeton.

In May 1946, fire destroyed the school's main building. Headmaster E. Francis Bowditch telegrammed students and faculty with the following message: "You, not the buildings, are LFA. Carry on." In 1948, Lake Forest Academy moved its campus to where it is currently located, the gargantuan former estate of Chicago meat baron J. Ogden Armour. Armour lost the premises thanks to the Depression of 1921. Subsequently, a group led by Samuel Insull acquired the property. They were in the process of converting it to a golf course when the Stock Market Crash of 1929 struck. Workers allegedly walked off the job of a half-finished locker room complex and never came back.

At the celebration of the school's centennial in 1957, head of school Harold H. Corbin Jr declared, "The City of Lake Forest, born in an educational dream, should never allow itself to forget that in one vital sense it is a manufacturing town--not merely residential--and its sole demonstrable product is education." The poet Robert Frost and Princeton president Harold Dodds also visited campus and gave speeches in conjunction with the activities. In other festivities, plans were announced to build a headmaster's residence on campus to be named for General Robert E. Wood, the business tycoon whose advocacy for America First before World War II had turned into a penchant for Joseph McCarthy in the postwar period.

Ferry Hall and Lake Forest Academy proceeded with their separate missions until the early 1970s, at which point the schools began to coordinate their efforts. A merger of the schools to form the coeducational Lake Forest Academy-Ferry Hall School took place in 1974. Later, the school's name officially became Lake Forest Academy.

Campus 

Lake Forest Academy is situated on a wooded 150-acre (0.61 km2) campus, which includes a small lake. There are 30 plus buildings on campus, including Reid Hall (formerly the estate of Chicago meat entrepreneur J. Ogden Armour), Corbin Academic Center, Hutchinson Commons, the Student Union (which houses the dining hall), five dormitories and several faculty housing buildings. The Cressey Center for the Arts (formerly the Fine & Performing Arts Center, or FPAC) is the site for all-school meetings, concerts and student theatrical productions; the Reyes Family Science Center; and a new student union building was opened in the fall of 2016,housed within it is the Stuart Center for Global Learning.

LFA has a variety of athletic facilities, including the David O. MacKenzie '50 Ice Arena, a swimming pool, the Glore Memorial Gymnasium, the James P. Fitzsimmons Athletic Wing, the Crown Fitness & Wellness Center, tennis courts, all-weather track (new as of 2005), and five full-sized playing fields for football, field hockey, and soccer.

Approximately three-quarters of the faculty of Lake Forest Academy live on campus.

Dormitories 
Lake Forest Academy houses its approximately 200 boarding students in five different campus dormitories. The dorms are single-sex and are of varying size.

Ferry Hall Dormitory 
Ferry Hall Dormitory was completed in the winter of 2012, and the first girls moved into their rooms in February of that year.

Named in honor of Ferry Hall School, and taking design elements from that campus, Ferry Hall Dormitory is the first building to be built on the campus of Lake Forest Academy for girls. With 36 beds, Ferry, as it has come to be known by students is the newest dormitory and is located across the field hockey field from Atlass Hall, forming a quad with the Crown Fitness and Wellness Center and Reid Hall.

In addition to housing students, Ferry Hall Dormitory is also the home to four faculty apartments.

Atlass Hall 

Atlass is the newest boys' dormitory, and located in the center of campus, it is closest to the academic buildings and dining hall. In addition to generously sized rooms and new furniture, Atlass also sports a comfortable lounge area with a television, sofas, and pool table. Atlass is a two-story building that houses 70 boys and four faculty members in apartments on either north or south end of the dorm.
Atlass opened in January, 1999 following a grant from H. Leslie Atlass Jr., class of 1936, in honor of his father (class of 1912). According to the inscription on the dormitory, Atlass Sr. was a "broadcasting pioneer and innovator." The financial gift was given with the condition that it be used to construct a new boys' dormitory, since Bates House, the previous boys' dormitory constructed in 1948, was in extremely poor condition.

Warner House 

Warner House houses about 30 boys and five faculty members; four in the actual structure, and one family in the attached Remsen Cottage. Warner is acknowledged to be the oldest structure on the Lake Forest Academy campus, thought in campus lore to have been a horse stable in the years before the academy when J. Ogden Armour occupied the campus space. Upon the academy's relocation to its current physical plant in 1948, the Board of Trustees dedicated the building to Ezra J. Warner Jr., class of 1895. Warner is located near the football field and with its relatively large number of faculty, has always been a dormitory that epitomizes the strong connection between students and faculty at LFA.

Marshall Field House 

Marshall Field House (or simply "Field") is the home to 72 female boarding students. Field is older than the Atlass dorm with its first season of housing students in 1965 but Field House is the closest dorm to the Student Center and has the most spirit of all of the academy dormitories.

Marshall Field House was named after Marshall Field, the founder of Marshall Field and Company, the Chicago-based chain of department stores. A substantial donation was made by Field to the academy, and the Marshall Field House was dedicated to him on October 9, 1965.

McIntosh Cottage 

McIntosh Cottage (known simply as "Mac") is a unique dormitory, housing only nine girls in five rooms. In addition to the nine student residents, McIntosh houses two faculty members in apartments. McIntosh was named for Arthur T. McIntosh, class of 1896, by his son.

Athletics 
The academy was formerly a member of the Chicago Independent School League and competed against eight other independent schools in Chicago's suburbs in some sports. The following sports are offered: 

Fall:
Cross-country running (Boys and Girls)
Field hockey (Girls)
Golf (Boys)
Ice hockey (Prep)
Soccer (Boys)
Swimming (Girls)
Tennis (Girls)
Volleyball (Girls)

Winter:
Basketball (Boys and Girls)
Ice hockey (Boys, Girls, and Prep)
Squash (Co-ed)
Swimming (Boys)

Spring:
Badminton (Girls)
Baseball (Boys)
Soccer (Girls)
Softball
Tennis (Boys)
Track & field (Boys and Girls)
Volleyball (Boys)
Lacrosse (Boys and Girls)

Students at LFA may also partake in non-team P.E. activities such as bowling, curling, salsa dance, jogging, lacrosse, water polo, weightlifting, and yoga, as well as a winter/spring musical.

LFA has a very strong athletic tradition that began in 1859 when Elmer E. Ellsworth, a close friend of Abraham Lincoln who already had become well known in the leading eastern cities by organizing military units called Zouaves, would be hired to drill the students. Ellsworth would be called to Washington, D.C. by Lincoln who made him a colonel. He was the first officer in the Civil War to give his life for the Union cause. The academy's drill team had been a pet project of Colonel Ellsworth, so that after the Civil War, when President Lincoln's body was brought through Chicago from Washington to Springfield, it would act as escort and guard of honor from Chicago to the State Capitol.

Because of the Ellsworth experiment, a gymnasium would be erected in 1864 and physical training was strongly stressed.  In 1876, the LFA baseball team played against Albert Spalding's Chicago White Stockings (later renamed the Cubs) professional team.  LFA lost; the score was 31 to 1.  In 1888, football would be introduced by math and physics instructor William H. ("Little Bill") Williams.  He would later coach and would be president of the University Athletic Association; and he has been called the father of the Western Collegiate Football Association, subsequently named "The Big Ten."  The academy's football tradition would be carried on by such legendary coaches as Clarence Herschberger and especially Ralph Jones whose teams during the 1920s stood among the finest in the entire country.  He had been the University of Illinois' head basketball coach and its freshman baseball and football coach.  For eight years he would achieve great success in the Big Ten and had written the acknowledged standard work on scientific basketball playing. Under his stewardship of LFA's football program during the 1920s, it became more and more difficult for the school to arrange games with secondary schools, and the schedule would be nearly filled against college freshman and junior college teams. In the early 1930s when an ex-player of Jones' bought the Chicago Bears, he would ask Jones to coach them. He did so with distinction, which included the first NFL championship.

Lake Forest Academy is notable for not being a full member of the Illinois High School Association, the body which governs most sports and competitive activities in Illinois.  According to a September 2009 interview with the school's athletic director, "LFA's athletic philosophy and active recruitment of international students conflict with the IHSA and that the Caxys are not eligible to compete for state championships in any sport. And LFA was not about to change its private-school philosophy (required athletics for every student) to conform to IHSA standards."

Mascot 

The LFA mascot is the "Caxy", which is ancient Greek for "ribbit" – the croaking sound made by a frog. In the early 1900s, Aristophanes' hit comedy, The Frogs, was the subject of a popular Greek literature class. LFA is believed to be the only school with "Caxys" as a nickname, although a popular athletic cheer at Yale University uses lines from the same Aristophanes play. The cheer dates back to at least 1896, when a student revolt against suspensions of several students led to dozens of students taking the train to Chicago, where upon alighting at Wells Street they wandered the streets and chanted, "Caxy, go wack! Go wack! Go wack! Caxy, go wack! Go wack! Go wack! Hi-O! Hi-O! Paraballoo! 'Cademy! 'Cademy! L.F.U.!!"

Traditions

Move-Up Day 
Move-Up Day began as a tradition at Ferry Hall in 1906, originally called Ivy Day, commemorating the annual planting of Ivy at the base of Smith Hall. Over time, this tradition would evolve into its current form, usually being held the day before Graduation. Departmental awards and speeches are given, and at the end of the ceremony, each class is invited to "move up" and literally take the place that they will occupy the next year: seniors move to sit with the alumni, juniors take the former spots of the seniors, and so on.

All-School Handshake 
At the beginning of each year every student, faculty member, and administrator gathers in the formal gardens and participates in the all school handshake. The entire school arranges themselves in a line around the periphery of the Formal Gardens and the Head of School begins by shaking the person's hand next to him, then he moves on to the next until each person has shaken the hand of all others.

Field Day
Field Day also began at Ferry Hall, starting in the spring of 1903 with "classes competing in races, the high jump, and a five-pound shot put, among other events." Field Day would die out in the 1970s as a result of the merger between Ferry Hall and Lake Forest Academy.

The House Cup
The House Cup Competition would be re-established in 2004. The students are divided up into four houses (Bird, Lewis, Sargent, and Welch) and compete in various events throughout the year. The house with the most event points at the end of the year have their name inscribed on a trophy that is displayed in Reid Hall; the colors of the winning team are used in the student handbook cover for the following year. This is based on the House system which is found in British schools; however unlike British schools, students are not divided up based on what dorm they are in. This is similar to the house system in the Harry Potter series, and as such the students often debate which LFA house corresponds with that in the series; there is never any consensus on this.

Reputation

Lake Forest Academy is well-recognized as one of the strongest college preparatory schools in the United States. All graduates attend a 4-year college or university, and many of them attend Ivy League schools, "Little Ivies", and other elite colleges and universities.

Ties to the leading colleges and universities with the academy date back to its very first graduating class. Innovation has been the school's hallmark particularly under strong headmasters such as William Mather Lewis (headmaster between 1905 and 1913 and, subsequently, president of George Washington University and thereafter Lafayette College) and E. Francis Bowditch (headmaster between 1941 and 1951 and later dean at MIT). John Wayne Richards led the school from 1913 until 1941. His pioneering instructional plan of a rotating class schedule received coverage in Time magazine in both 1930 and 1931 under headlines that employed a term of endearment for the headmaster that referenced both his size and a common nickname for Richard. Harold Harlow Corbin Jr. served as head of the school from 1951 until 1969. Corbin was also a renowned collector of eagle figurines, and he occasionally lectured on the topic.

One of the fundamental strengths of the school is the potential for strong relationships that form between students and faculty. Faculty, approximately three-quarters of whom live on campus, also serve as coaches and dorm supervisors. This aspect of the academy is often promoted by the Admissions Department and others as a feature that sets the school apart from other institutions. Former head of School Dr. John Strudwick mentions that "LFA prides itself on its small classes and its Advisory system which both promote a unique and productive relationship between faculty and students."

On film
The campus has been used as a shooting location for several films, among them: Damien: Omen II, Ordinary People, The Babe, and The Package.

Notable alumni

Arts
 John Agar, actor, formerly married to Shirley Temple.
 Bix Beiderbecke, jazz cornet player (expelled; attended 1921–22).
 David Bradley, film director 
 Temple Hoyne Buell (1914), architect, viewed as the father of the modern indoor shopping mall.
 Jay Chandrasekhar, comedian and film director.
 Max Demián (2005), performance artist.
 Jean Harlow, actress (attended 1926–1927).
 Jesse Hibbs (1925), film director
 Brad Morris (1994), television actor
 Robert Myhrum (1944), television director
 Tom Neal, actor.
 Kelly Perine (1987), actor.
 McLean Stevenson, actor.
 Stephen Wade (1970), folk musician.
 Melora Walters (1979), actress

Business and law
 James Aubrey (attended 1931–32), president of CBS and MGM.
 Charles Edmund Beard (1916), aviation pioneer and president of Braniff Airlines.
 Andrew T. Berlin (1979) businessman and philanthropist; minority stakeholder in the Chicago Cubs Major League Baseball team.
 Ralph Bogan co-owned baseball's Milwaukee/Atlanta Braves.
 James R. Cargill (1941), billionaire scion of Minnesota's Cargill family; pioneered in the computerization of animal feed formulations.
 Gaylord Donnelley (attended 1923–24), former chairman of R. R. Donnelley & Sons.
 Charles Gelatt(1935) Wisconsin businessman and philanthropist, early co-owner of the Milwaukee Brewers
 George N. Gillett Jr. (1956), communications mogul, former co–owner of the English Premier League team Liverpool F.C. and NASCAR auto-racing team Richard Petty Motorsports
 Louis Upton (1907), co-founder of Whirlpool Corporation.
 Rawleigh Warner Jr. (attended 1935–36), chairman/CEO of Mobil Oil.

Government and public service
 Makola Abdullah (1986), 14th President of Virginia State University (VSU).
 Richard L. Conolly (1910), Admiral of the United States Navy during World War II.
 Jan Crull Jr., Native American rights advocate, filmmaker, attorney.
 Geoff Diehl, class of 1988, State Representative for the 7th Plymouth District of the Commonwealth of Massachusetts
 John Francis Grady (1948), United States District Court Judge; senior judge for the Northern District of Illinois.
 Melvin R. Laird (attended 1938–39), US Congressman (1952–69) and Secretary of Defense (1969–73).
 Edward Everett Nourse, theologian.
 Nauman S. Scott, class of 1934, one of the first Louisiana U.S. District Court Judges to advocate desegregation.
 Charles H. Wacker (1872), chairman of the Chicago Plan Commission and beer-maker.

Journalism and letters
 Bill Ayers, professor at the University of Illinois at Chicago who co-founded the Weather Underground.
 Ward Just, Washington Post Vietnam War correspondent and author
 Michael Leonard, class of 1966, feature reporter for NBC's Today show.
 Rebecca Makkai, class of 1995, author 
 Ralph J. Mills, poet and critic.
 Robert Wilson Patterson, class of 1867, newspaper publisher.
 Bill Schulz, class of 1994, Fox News.

Science
 Patrick M. McCarthy (surgeon), class of 1973, heart surgeon.
 Cristopher Moore, class of 1983, computer scientist, mathematician, and physicist.
 Karl Patterson Schmidt, herpetologist.
 Paul Starrett, class of 1883,  structural engineer.
 Charles Thom, microbiologist and mycologist.

Athletics
 Neil Blatchford (1964), speed skater who competed in the 1972 Winter Olympics.
 Angus Brandt, Australian professional basketball player
 Alex DeBrincat, right winger for NHL's Chicago Blackhawks
 Alfred Eissler, NFL player
 Dylan Ennis, professional basketball player
 Tyler Ennis, NBA player for the Los Angeles Lakers.
 Babe Frump, NFL player with the Chicago Bears.
 Ángel García, professional basketball player. 
 Geneviève Lacasse, Olympic gold medalist goalkeeper, Canadian national women's hockey team.
 David Levine, ARCA Racing Series race car driver for Lira Motorsports.
 Victor Pineda, soccer player for Chicago Fire and United States U-18 national team.
 Teddy Purcell, right winger for NHL's Tampa Bay Lightning.
 Paul Schuette, NFL player with the New York Giants, Chicago Bears, and Boston Braves.

Other
 Robert S. Hartman, logician and philosopher

References

External links 

 

 
Boarding schools in Illinois
Co-educational boarding schools
Educational institutions established in 1857
Independent School League
Lake Forest Academy alumni
Private high schools in Illinois
Lake Forest, Illinois
Schools in Lake County, Illinois
Preparatory schools in Illinois
1857 establishments in Illinois